The name Social Credit Party has been used by a number of  political parties.

In Canada:
Social Credit Party of Canada
Manitoba Social Credit Party
Ralliement créditiste
Ralliement créditiste du Québec
Social Credit Party of Alberta
Social Credit Party of Saskatchewan
Social Credit Party of British Columbia
Social Credit Party of Ontario

In the United Kingdom:
Social Credit Party of Great Britain and Northern Ireland

In New Zealand:
Social Credit Party (New Zealand)
Social Credit-NZ

In Australia:
Social Credit Party (Australia)

In Solomon Islands:
Solomon Islands Social Credit Party

See also
 Social Credit
Canadian social credit movement